Suicidal Angels is a Greek thrash metal band formed in 2001 in Athens, Greece, by guitarist/vocalist and main songwriter Nick Melissourgos. Since its inception, the band has released seven studio albums, and has gone through several line-up changes leaving Melissourgos as the only constant member.

History

Early years (2001–2006)
The band's first demo, United by Hate, was released in 2002. Two years later, and after a further two self-released demos, they recorded their first extended play, called Bloodthirsty Humanity, followed in 2006 by the first work of the band distributed by a record label (Greek label Live Records), the EP Armies of Hell. The band's line up for this release consisted of Nick Melissourgos on guitar and vocals, Themis Katsimichas on guitar, Orfeas Tzortzopoulos on drums, and Christine Gemidopoulou on bass.

Eternal Domination and Sanctify the Darkness (2007–2009)
Soon after, Christine left and was replaced by Sotiris Skarpalezos on bass, and the band started recording its first full-length album, Eternal Domination, which was released in July 2007 by California based OSM Records. During that year, and after having built up modest experience by playing the local club circuit in their hometown and a few gigs abroad, Suicidal Angels went on their first ever tour, 
joining Rotting Christ's Theogonia Balkans Tour, while later in 2007 and 2008 they toured in Europe with Onslaught and Massacre. Prior to the release of Eternal Domination, in May 2007 Suicidal Angels also supported influential German thrashers Kreator in Athens. This live proved to be a turning point in their career, as Mille Petrozza noticed the band, praised their live performance and continued to support them until their breakthrough into the music industry.

In early 2009 Sotiris Skarpalezos left the band and was replaced by Angel Kritsotakis on bass. In March 2009, the band visited the "Music Factory & Prophecy Studios" in Germany to record its second studio album, Sanctify the Darkness. Soon after the recordings of the album had finished, guitarist Themis Katsimichas left the band to pursue a career as a medical doctor and was replaced by Panos Spanos. Later that year, the band entered the Rock The Nation and Nuclear Blast band contest, in which they eventually took first place, topping 1,200 bands from Europe.

Following the release of Sanctify the Darkness in November 2009 by Nuclear Blast, the group started touring with bands like Kataklysm and Overkill, while also getting an opportunity to perform at many European festivals, including Wacken Open Air and Metalcamp. Suicidal Angels also earned the opening slot at the Greek leg of the Sonisphere Festival in 2010, supporting the "Big Four" of thrash metal (Anthrax, Megadeth, Slayer, and Metallica).

Dead Again, Bloodbath and Divide and Conquer (2010–2015)
2010 proved similarly productive for the band as they released their third studio record, Dead Again, having already done a tour with Steelwing, Enforcer, and Cauldron. This year also marked the time Suicidal Angels toured again along with some of the most respected thrash metal bands, opening for Kreator, Exodus, and Death Angel during the Thrashfest Tour 2010.

In spring of 2011, the band toured in Eastern Europe, again with Death Angel, and participated in more summer festivals in Ukraine.

The band recorded their fourth album, Bloodbath, in the fall of 2011, which hit the stores in January 2012, making it to the German charts at position #84 and to the Austrian charts at position #78. The release of the record was followed by the Full of Hate Tour 2012, with the line up including Cannibal Corpse, Behemoth, Legion of the Damned, and Misery Index.

After the success of that tour, the band was confirmed for more summer festivals, such as Brutal Assault Open Air (for the 2nd time in a row) in August of the same year.
Soon after the end of summer, a change in the line up took place, with Chris Tsitsis replacing Panos Spanos on the guitar. 2013 found Suicidal Angels flying for the first time to Latin America, with first stop at Mexico City, followed by shows in Brazil. After returning home, the band continued promoting Bloodbath, playing several shows all over Greece.
Later on, locked up in “Zero Gravity” Studios in their hometown Athens, they started giving shape to their 5th album, dedicating a month of pre-production. With Angel Lelikakis, a long-time avid fan since his early teens, replacing Angel Kritsotakis on bass after the latter left the band, recordings for the new album commenced again at the "Music Factory & Prophecy Studios". As soon as the recordings were over, the band flew to Sweden to work with critically acclaimed producer Fredrik Nordstrom at Fredman Studios in Gothenburg. The result was Divide and Conquer, released on the 10th of January 2014, reaching #82 in the German charts.

Shortly after, the band hit the road once again, with a headlining tour called the Conquering Europe Tour, which also yielded the band's first live album, Conquering Europe, recorded in Essen, Germany.

Division of Blood and Years of Aggression (2016–present)
With constant touring not deterring the band from regularly delivering new albums, Suicidal Angels released their sixth album Division of Blood in 2016, which saw yet another change in the line up, this time with Gus Drax replacing Chris Tsitsis on guitar.

On June 1, 2018, Suicidal Angels announced on their official website that they were working on their seventh studio album, Years of Aggression, which was released on August 9, 2019. The album managed to hit the charts at #33 in Germany, #63 in Austria and #71 in Switzerland. The production took place at Soundlodge Studio where the drums where recorded, and also at the Zero Gravity Studios where they recorded guitars, vocals and bass. After they finished the recordings, the band flew over to Sweden to enter the Fascination Street Studios. There, the album was mixed by Jens Bogren and mastered by Tony Lindgren.

The band participated in the fall 2018 installment of the MTV Headbangers Ball European Tour with Exodus, Death Angel and Sodom.

Members

Current members
Nick Melissourgos – vocals, lead and rhythm guitars (2001–present)
Orfeas Tzortzopoulos – drums (2003–present)
Angel Lelikakis – bass (2013–present)
Gus Drax – lead guitars (2015–present)

Past members
Themis Katsimichas – lead guitars  (2005–2009)
Panos Spanos – lead guitars (2009-2012)
Chris Tsitsis – lead guitars (2012-2015)
Christina Gemidopoulou – bass (2005–2006)
Sotiris Skarpalezos – bass (2006–2009)
Angelos Kritsotakis – bass (2009–2013)

Timeline

Discography

Studio albums

EPs
 Bloodthirsty Humanity (2005)
 Armies of Hell (2006)

Demos
 United by Hate (2002)
 Angels' Sacrifice (2003)
 The Calm Before the Storm (2004)

Live albums
 Conquering Europe (2016)

Gallery

References

External links

 Official website

Musical groups from Athens
Greek heavy metal musical groups
Musical groups established in 2001
Musical quartets